José Mauricio Cienfuegos (born 12 February 1968) is a Salvadoran former professional footballer who played as an attacking midfielder.

Club career
Cienfuegos began his professional career in 1985 with Racing Junior. He played the next two seasons for Soyapango, and then moved to Luís Ángel Firpo, where he would play for four years.

Cienfuegos moved to Mexico to play for Atlético Morelia in the 1991, and then signed with Santos in 1992. However, after just one season at Santos Laguna, Cienfuegos became unhappy with how he was being used at the club and decided to try his luck in Europe. In the summer of 1993, he had trials with Swiss champions Servette and La Liga side Lleida. Cienfuegos was close to signing with the Spanish side, but ultimately he was not offered a contract, and he returned to Mexico with a brief stint at Tampico Madero during the second half of the 1994-95 season.

Los Angeles Galaxy
Cienfuegos played two more seasons with Luis Ángel Firpo before joining Major League Soccer for its inaugural 1996 season. Cienfuegos played for Los Angeles Galaxy for eight years as a midfielder, from 1996 until his retirement after the 2003 season. During those years, he established himself, along with Carlos Valderrama, Marco Etcheverry, and Peter Nowak, as one of the best playmakers in the league. He was elected to the MLS Best XI three times, in 1996, 1998, and 1999, and played in seven MLS All-Star Games as a central midfielder. During his MLS career, Galaxy won the 2000 CONCACAF Champions Cup, the 2001 U.S. Open Cup, and the 2002 MLS Cup. He finished his MLS career with 78 assists and 35 goals in 206 games for the club.

International career
Cienfuegos was an important player for the El Salvador national team, joining the team as a teenager, and continuing to lead his national side well into his thirties. He has earned a total of 68 caps, scoring 8 goals, all of them during a home game. He has represented his country in a massive 32 FIFA World Cup qualification matches and played at the 1995 UNCAF Nations Cup as well as the 1996 and 1998 CONCACAF Gold Cups.

Cienfuegos played his final international game in July 2003, in a testimonial match against Mexico, played at the Galaxy's Home Depot Center.

International goals
Scores and results list El Salvador's goal tally first.

Coaching career
Cienfuegos was appointed head coach of Nejapa in El Salvador's Primera División de Fútbol Profesional in 2008. Despite having a good first season, a poor start to his second season in charge and non-payment of his players led to him to resign as head coach of the team. On 22 June 2011, it was announced that Mauricio Cienfuegos had been appointed as a technical coach for the LA Galaxy Academy.

Honors
CD Luis Ángel Firpo
 Primera División de Fútbol Profesional: 1988–89, 1990–91, 1991–92

Los Angeles Galaxy
 CONCACAF Champions' Cup: 2000
 (Runner-up 1997)
 MLS Cup: 2002
 (Runner-up : 1996, 1999, 2001)
 MLS Supporters' Shield: 1998, 2002
 (Runner-up : 1996, 1999)
 U.S. Open Cup: 2001
 (Runner-up : 2002)

Individual
 MLS Best XI: 1996, 1998, 1999

Personal life
Cienfuegos lives with his wife and three children in the San Gabriel Valley, California.

References

External links
 

1968 births
Living people
Sportspeople from San Salvador
Association football midfielders
Salvadoran footballers
Salvadoran expatriate footballers
El Salvador international footballers
1996 CONCACAF Gold Cup players
1998 CONCACAF Gold Cup players
C.D. Luis Ángel Firpo footballers
Atlético Morelia players
Santos Laguna footballers
LA Galaxy players
Tampico Madero F.C. footballers
Expatriate footballers in Mexico
Expatriate soccer players in the United States
Salvadoran football managers
Liga MX players
Major League Soccer players
Major League Soccer All-Stars
LA Galaxy non-playing staff
Salvadoran expatriate sportspeople in Mexico
Salvadoran expatriate sportspeople in the United States